High Street Kensington may refer to:

Kensington High Street, a popular shopping street in London
High Street Kensington, a Tube station on the Circle and District Lines